This is a list  of the islands of Greenland by area.

List of islands

Islands  and greater

Islands less than

Islands less than

See also
List of islands by area
List of islands of Greenland
Lists of islands

Area
Greenland